Warner/Chappell Music Inc. et al. v. Fullscreen Inc. et al. (13-cv-05472) was a case against multi-channel network Fullscreen, filed by the National Music Publishers Association on behalf of Warner/Chappell Music and 15 other music publishers, which alleged that Fullscreen illegally reaped the profits of unlicensed cover videos on YouTube without paying any royalties to the rightful publishers and songwriters.

According to the lawsuit, the defendant Fullscreen was accused of having "willfully ignored their obligation to obtain licenses and pay royalties to exploit the vast majority of the musical content disseminated over Fullscreen's networks." Among the musical content that Fullscreen allegedly infringed upon were songs by Justin Bieber, Ke$ha, Kanye West, and Katy Perry.

Facts 

The National Music Publishers Association filed this copyright infringement lawsuit in the Southern District of New York on August 6, 2013, accusing Fullscreen of 4 distinct copyright violations: 1) direct copyright infringement, 2) contributory copyright infringement, 3) inducement of copyright infringement, and 4) vicarious copyright infringement. By way of explanation, the plaintiff suggested that Fullscreen 1) copied directly from another's work without a license (direct infringement), 2) contributed to and supported  its partners' infringement (contributory copyright infringement), 3) is liable for the actions of its partners' infringement and directly profited financially from the act (vicarious infringement), and 4) aided/induced the act of infringement knowingly.

Prior to this, the NMPA filed a similar lawsuit against another multi-channel network, Maker Studios, which then very promptly agreed to settle out of court and to establish a compensation model for both past infringements and future licenses that fully comply with the Copyright Act.

NMPA 

The National Music Publishers Association (NMPA) is the largest trade association that represents American music publishers and songwriters, including Warner/Chappell Music and Palm Valley Music. It was founded in 1917, and currently hosts more than 300 members. Its primary mission is to protect the rights of publishers and songwriters, in both domestic and international matters. It aims to maintain a music business environment that fosters financial and creative success of artists, with its particular focus on affiliated publishers and songwriters.

Fullscreen 

Fullscreen is one of the largest YouTube multi-channel networks that generates over 3 billion monthly video views across all of their channels. This multimillion-dollar company was founded in January 2011 by CEO George Strompolos, and houses some of YouTube's most successful talent, including Lindsey Stirling, The Fine Brothers, Tyler Ward, and Megan Nicole. According to the company, Fullscreen is affiliated with over 15,000 YouTube channels that have garnered a total of 200 million subscribers and over 2.5 billion views per month. Fullscreen acquires more than 30 million unique visitors each month, across all of their channels. Like many other multichannel networks, Fullscreen primarily consists of channels with covered musical content. The network profits directly from the advertising revenue generated by these unlicensed music videos.

Result 

A settlement was reached that required Fullscreen creators to license their music videos or remove them completely. The channel managed by Fullscreen was to remove all offending videos entirely, whereas Fullscreen partners were given the opportunity to license these videos.
George Strompolos, Fullscreen CEO, commented: 
 "Fullscreen is pleased to be one of the leading multi-channel networks to establish landmark licenses with major music publishers on behalf of Fullscreen's music artists. We commend the NMPA for their proactiveness and helping to clear the way for us to establish new relationships with music publishers. Fullscreen will continue to pioneer 'win/win/win' solutions for emerging musicians, their audiences, and existing rights holders within the music industry."
David Israelite, NMPA president and CEO noted:
 "This settlement demonstrates the fundamental value of songwriters and their music publishing partners, and highlights NMPA's mission to fight for fair compensation and protection of songwriters' rights."
Fullscreen, along with other multi-channel networks, are now aiming to create deals with music publishers, in order for its partners to be able to continue producing cover videos. Fullscreen and Maker Studios have announced a deal already with Universal Music Publishing Group, which allows the networks access and monetization of Universal's entire music library. The revenue from these videos will then be split among the YouTube artist, Fullscreen, and Universal Music Publishing Group.

Background

Multi-channel Networks 

Multi-channel networks (MCN) are companies that work with YouTube channels and assist with funding, rights' management, audience development, and monetization. They are neither affiliated with nor endorsed by Google, and receive a portion of the advertising revenue that they help generate for their affiliated YouTube channels. Recently, it has become more profitable to work with brands on integrated marketing, using clever ways to incorporate advertising within a YouTube creator's video. Though MCNs can offer YouTube creators with connections to brands and sponsorship deals, as well as financial support, there has been criticism against them. YouTube personality Ray William Johnson left his MCN Maker Studios, when he was asked to renegotiate his contract and give up 40% of his advertising revenue and 50% of the intellectual property of his show, "Equals Three."

Content ID 

Content ID is a system built by YouTube (Google) in 2007 that scans every video uploaded to YouTube for copyright infringement. Copyright holders register their content into the system, and when Content ID identifies usage of that content in a user-generated video, it notifies the rights-owner and allows them the choice to 1) monetize the video, 2) block the video completely, or 3) track the video and gain all analytics insights. YouTube producers may dispute or appeal Content ID claims. Content ID has made it easier for content owners to track down usage of their content and regain control over its availability and monetization on YouTube. Uploaders receive a strike for each case of infringement, and have their accounts suspended upon their third strike. YouTubers and certain publishers have settled on blanket synchronization licenses, that allow publishers to take up to 50% of the revenues generated by videos that use their content. YouTube has direct licensing contracts with many music publishers, which pay them the due royalties for cover songs uploaded by YouTubers. Multi-channel networks like Fullscreen, however, are not covered under these contracts.

Viacom International, Inc. v. YouTube, Inc. 
Copyright infringement cases regarding unlicensed videos on YouTube began long before this case between the NMPA and Fullscreen. In 2007, Viacom sued Google over alleged copyright violations within its YouTube service. In March 2014, the two companies announced its settlement, stating that "Google and Viacom today jointly announced the  resolution of the Viacom vs. YouTube copyright litigation. This settlement reflects the growing collaborative dialogue between our two companies on important opportunities and we look forward to working more closely together." When the lawsuit was first initiated, Viacom was asking $1 billion in damages from Google, alleging that YouTube had engaged in "brazen" and "massive" copyright infringement, by allowing its users to upload thousands of videos owned by Viacom, without licenses. In 2010, Google's motion for summary judgment seeking dismissal was granted, based on the Digital Millennium Copyright Act's "safe harbor" provisions. Though Viacom appealed, District Judge Stanton granted summary judgment again, in favor of defendant Google in April 2013.

Related Issues 

 Copyright infringement
 Viacom International Inc. v. YouTube, Inc.
 Content ID
 Copyright Act of 1976
 Digital Millennium Copyright Act
 Lenz v. Universal Music Corp.

References 

Digital Millennium Copyright Act case law
Fullscreen (company)
United States lawsuits
Warner Music Group
2013 in United States case law